The 2009–10 PFF League was the 6th season of second tier of Pakistan Football Federation. The season was scheduled to start on 19 November 2009 and concluded on 6 January 2010.

Departmental Leg

Group A

Group B

Club Leg

First stage

Group A

Group B

Group C

Semi-finals

Final

Grand-Final

References

Pakistan Football Federation League seasons
2009–10 in Pakistani football